Mulda is an urban locality (an urban-type settlement) under the administrative jurisdiction of the town of republic significance of Vorkuta in the Komi Republic, Russia. It had no recorded population as of the 2010 Census.

Administrative and municipal status
Within the framework of administrative divisions, the urban-type settlement of Mulda is subordinated to Komsomolsky Urban-Type Settlement Administrative Territory, which is itself subordinated to the town of republic significance of Vorkuta. Within the framework of municipal divisions, Mulda is a part of Vorkuta Urban Okrug.

References

Notes

Sources

Urban-type settlements in the Komi Republic
